Richmond Raceway (RR) is a , D-shaped, asphalt race track located just outside Richmond, Virginia in unincorporated Henrico County. It hosts the NASCAR Cup Series, NASCAR Xfinity Series and the NASCAR Camping World Truck Series. Known as "America's premier short track", it has formerly hosted events such as the International Race of Champions, Denny Hamlin Short Track Showdown, and the USAC sprint car series. Due to Richmond Raceway's unique "D" shape which allows drivers to reach high speeds, its racing grooves, and proclivity for contact Richmond is a favorite among NASCAR drivers and fans.

Nicknamed the "Action Track", Richmond sold out 33 consecutive NASCAR Cup Series races before the streak ended in September 2008 due to the Great Recession as well as the impact of Tropical Storm Hanna. Richmond has hosted the final "regular-season" race, leading up to the start of the NASCAR Cup Series playoffs, each year since the concept was introduced in 2004 until 2018 when it was moved into the playoffs.

In 2010, the track introduced a state-of-the-art video scoring tower that boasts more LED square footage than any other in the motorsports industry. The cap features four HD LED screens that measure 38 feet wide by 24 feet high. The screens broadcast live race action and pre-produced videos and graphics. The stem shows the running order and has the ability to rotate through the entire field. Prior to 2019, the raceway had a track seating of 59,000.

History

Racing in Virginia 
Racing sports has a long tradition in Virginia, dating back to colonial English times. From 1898 to the first World War, the Deep Run Hunt Club the Northside area of Ginter Park was the site of the club's somewhat annual steeplechase race. After a decade hiatus, the annual races were moved to Curles Neck in 1928 on the south side of Richmond.

World War II 
Shortly after the attack on Pearl Harbor, all auto racing was suspended due to the second World War. From 1942 to 1945, no events were contested, as they were prohibited by the US government primarily on account of rationing.

Races resume 
The 1946 AAA Championship Car season was unique in that it was the first post-war IndyCar race and because the Atlantic Rural Exposition had built a new state fairgrounds at the old Strawberry Hill Farm near Ginter Park. The ½ -mile dirt track would be suitable for both annual "Strawberry Hill" horse races and car races, and was known as the "Atlantic Rural Fairgrounds Track", "Strawberry Hill", and "Strawberry Hill Raceway" On October 12, 1946, Ted Horn gained the distinction of winning the track's first race in an open-wheel Indy-style car.

Strawberry Hill Raceway joins national racing circuit 
Two years later, when the NASCAR schedule was being formed, this short track joined several others on the circuit. In 1953, the track began hosting the Grand National Series with Lee Petty winning that first race in Richmond. The original track was paved in 1968. In 1988, the track was re-designed into its present D-shaped configuration.

The name for the raceway complex was "Strawberry Hill" until the Virginia State Fairgrounds site was bought out in 1999 and renamed the "Richmond International Raceway".  The Strawberry Hill Races, which are a series of steeplechase horse races were formerly held the third Saturday of April at the Richmond Raceway Complex. In 2001, the races were moved to Colonial Downs in New Kent County, Virginia's first Thoroughbred racetrack.

Richmond Raceway Complex 

The Richmond Raceway Complex also hosts the Intergalactic Bead Show, Virginia Golf Show, Bassarama, the Richmond Home and Garden Show, the RV and Camping Expo, the Richmond Boat Show, the Richmond Gun Show, the Richmond Classic Sports Card Show, the East Coast Sawmill and Logging Equipment Expo, the Craftsmen Classic Spring and Christmas Shows, Bizarre Bazaar Spring and Christmas Shows and other various arts and craft events.

Outdoor festivals currently hosted by the Richmond Raceway Complex include the 102.1 "The X" chili cook-off, the ACCA Temple Pork Festival and concerts featuring local and national recording artists.

Outdoor festivals that have been held there included the State Fair of Virginia, the Richmond Highland Games and Celtic Festival, the March of Dimes Bikers for Babies, the K95 Country Music Festival and the Virginia Food Festival. 

In 2021, after NASCAR partner and online sports gambling company WynnBET launched a mobile betting app accessible to Virginia residents, it was announced that a sports betting lounge would be built at Richmond Raceway.

NASCAR-sanctioned races 
Richmond Raceway is home to two NASCAR races in both the Cup Series and Xfinity Series.

There are a pair of spring races, usually held on the first weekend of April. The Xfinity race is currently 250 laps (187.5 miles) and is named the ToyotaCare 250. The NASCAR Cup Series race is currently 400 laps (300 miles) and is named the Toyota Owners 400.

There are a pair of fall races, usually held on the second weekend of September. The 250 lap (187.5 miles) Xfinity race is currently sponsored by Virginia 529 College Savings Plan and is named the Go Bowling 250. The 400 lap (300 miles) fall Cup race is currently sponsored by Federated Auto Parts and is named the Federated Auto Parts 400. Under the current schedule it is the final race before the playoff-style Chase for the Championship series of races that determine the Cup champion begins, and the last chance for drivers to earn a place in the Chase.

Until 2005, Richmond was home to a fall Craftsman Truck Series race. Starting with the 2006 schedule, that date was transferred to Talladega Superspeedway, and the series did not return to Richmond until 2020. Until 2009, Richmond was also home to a June IndyCar Series race. In July 2009, it was announced that IndyCar would not return to the Raceway in 2010. Richmond was scheduled to return to the IndyCar schedule in 2020, replacing Pocono Raceway after violent crashes at the track in 2018 and 2019 caused outcry from several drivers. The 2020 race was canceled due to the COVID-19 pandemic.

Timeline 
 October 12, 1946: driving an open-wheel car, Ted Horn wins the first race at the Atlantic Rural Exposition Fairgrounds on a half-mile dirt track.
 1955: Paul Sawyer and famed racer Joe Weatherly buy the property. The track becomes known as the "Atlantic Rural Fairgrounds".
 March 10, 1964: The first Richmond race to run under temporary lights
 The track operated as a  oval through the spring race of 1988. The first race under the new configuration was in September 1988. Lights were added for the fall 1991 race.
 The track was previously called "Strawberry Hill", the "Virginia State Fairgrounds", and the "Richmond Fairgrounds Speedway"; the annual fair made the track a popular venue.
 Richard Petty holds the record for most wins at Richmond with 13; David Pearson, Darrell Waltrip, Rusty Wallace, and Kyle Busch are tied for second with six.
 Richmond is the site of the famous battle between Dale Earnhardt and Darrell Waltrip in 1986. Earnhardt tapped Waltrip in turn four and both drivers hit the wall, handing the lead to Kyle Petty who avoided the crash and won.
 Richmond hosted two International Race of Champions events, in 2004 and 2005, won by Matt Kenseth in 2004 and Mark Martin in 2005, with 2005 being the final season of the series.
 Site of Tony Stewart's first career Cup Series win, in 1999.
 June 30, 2001, Indy Racing League runs their first ever short track race.
 Site of Kasey Kahne's first career Cup Series win, in 2005.
 May 6, 2006: Dale Earnhardt Jr.'s final win in the #8 Budweiser Chevrolet before moving to Hendrick Motorsports in 2008.
 June 11, 2017: Track president Dennis Bickmeier announces RIR would be renamed to "Richmond Raceway", part of a $30 million renovation of the infield known as Richmond Raceway Reimagined.
 September 22, 2018: Kyle Busch nabs his milestone 50th-career Cup win. It's also the first time the track hosted a Playoff race.

Races and events

Current races 
 NASCAR Cup Series
 Toyota Owners 400 (April)
 Federated Auto Parts 400 (August)
 NASCAR Xfinity Series
 ToyotaCare 250 (April)
 NASCAR Craftsman Truck Series
 ToyotaCare 250 (August)

Previous races 
 AAA Sprint Cars (1946–1948, 1952–1953)
 AAA Stock Car (1952)
 ADRC midgets (1946–1948)
 Denny Hamlin Short Track Showdown (2011–2013)
 IndyCar Series
 Indy Richmond 300 (2001–2009)
 International Race of Champions (2004–2005)
 NASCAR K&N Pro Series East
 UNOH 100 (2011–2015)
 NASCAR Xfinity Series
 ToyotaCare 250 (1982–2020)
 NASCAR Craftsman Truck Series
 Cheerios Betty Crocker 200 (1995–2005)
 NASCAR Convertible Division (1957–1959)
 NASCAR Grand American (1968–1970)
 NASCAR Goody's Dash Series (1975, 1976, 1979–1981)
 NASCAR AutoZone Elite Division, Southeast Series (1991)
 NASCAR Sportsman Series (1990)
 NASCAR Whelen Modified Tour (1990–1993, 1997, 1999–2002)
 URC sprint cars (1956, 1960)
 USAC Silver Crown Series
 USAC Honda National Midget Championship

Records 
 NASCAR Cup Series qualifying: Jeff Gordon, 20.674 sec. (130.599 mph, 210.180 km/h); 2013
 NASCAR Cup Series race: Dale Jarrett, 2 hrs. 45 min. 4 sec. (109.047 mph, 175.494 km/h); 1997
 NASCAR Xfinity Series qualifying: Kyle Busch, 20.874 sec. (129.348 mph 208.165 km/h); 2004
 NASCAR Xfinity Series race: Dale Jarrett, 1 hr. 47 min. 13 sec. (104.928 mph, 168.685 km/h); 1995
 IndyCar Series qualifying: Sam Hornish Jr., 15.3197 sec. (176.244 mph, 283.637 km/h); 2005
 Rusty Wallace Race Experience Fastest Non Professional Driver: Paul Delagrange, 20.894 sec. (129.412 mph): 2020

Lap Records 
The official race lap records at Richmond Raceway (formerly Richmond International Raceway) are listed as:

NASCAR Cup Series records 
(As of 9/10/11)

* minimum 10 starts

References

External links 

 
 Map and circuit history at RacingCircuits.info
 
 Richmond International Raceway Page on NASCAR.com
 Jayski's Richmond International Raceway Page – Current and Past RIR News
 RIR visitor's guide
 Richmond Raceway Complex website
 Richmond International Raceway Seating Charts

IndyCar Series tracks
NASCAR tracks
International Race of Champions tracks
Buildings and structures in Henrico County, Virginia
Sports venues in Richmond, Virginia
Motorsport venues in Virginia
Tourist attractions in Henrico County, Virginia
Sports venues completed in 1946
1946 establishments in Virginia